West Oakland station is a Bay Area Rapid Transit (BART) station in the West Oakland neighborhood of Oakland, California. It has two elevated side platforms, and is located near the eastern end of the Transbay Tube. All main BART lines except the Orange Line stop at the station. The Oakland Wye is located to the east of the station.

History 
The station opened on September 16, 1974 – the last station of the initial BART system to open – with the beginning of service through the Transbay Tube. The station was originally named Oakland West, contrary to the actual neighborhood name. The efforts of neighborhood activists led BART to correct the name to West Oakland, between 1986 and 1987.
In June 2020, the BART Board of Directors approved a mixed-use transit oriented development project on the parking lots surrounding the station.

Bus connections 
The station has a busway on its south side, which serves AC Transit bus routes 14, 29, 36, and 62. Bus stops on 7th Street on the north side of the station serve AC Transit routes 29, 62, 314, and 800, as well as the Flixbus intercity bus service.

References

External links 

BART – West Oakland

Bay Area Rapid Transit stations in Alameda County, California
Stations on the Yellow Line (BART)
Stations on the Green Line (BART)
Stations on the Red Line (BART)
Stations on the Blue Line (BART)
Railway stations in Oakland, California
Railway stations in the United States opened in 1973
Bus stations in Alameda County, California